Albert Valentinovich Borzenkov (born 3 January 1973) is a Russian football coach and a former player.

Honours 
 Russian Premier League runner-up: 1997.
 Russian Premier League bronze: 1996.
 Top 33 players year-end list: 1996.

International career
Borzenkov played one game for Russia on 30 May 1998 in a friendly against Georgia.

External links 
 Profile 
 
 

1973 births
Living people
Russian footballers
Russia under-21 international footballers
Russia international footballers
FC Dynamo Stavropol players
Russian Premier League players
FC Rotor Volgograd players
FC Tom Tomsk players
FC Shinnik Yaroslavl players
FC Sokol Saratov players
FC Sibir Novosibirsk players
Sportspeople from Kursk
Association football defenders
FC Avangard Kursk players